Bintangor River is a river in Sarawak state, Malaysia.  It is a tributary to the Rajang River. The river has previously had issues with pollution, but in recent years initiatives have been undertaken to try to improve the situation.

See also
 List of rivers of Malaysia

References

External links
Over 200 Turn Up To Clean Sungai Bintangor

Rivers of Sarawak